The 2nd constituency of the Haute-Savoie (French: Deuxième circonscription de la Haute-Savoie) is a French legislative constituency in the Haute-Savoie département. Like the other 576 French constituencies, it elects one MP using a two round electoral system.

Description

The 2nd constituency of Haute-Savoie sits in the south west of the department including some parts of Annecy, which it shares with Haute-Savoie's 1st constituency.

The seat has historically supported centre right candidates; however, in 2017 the seat along with three others in the department fell to Emmanuel Macron's En Marche! party.

Assembly members

Election results

2022

 
 
 
|-
| colspan="8" bgcolor="#E9E9E9"|
|-
 

 
 
 
 
 
* Tardy stood for LR at the previous election, but as a non-aligned right candidate in 2022. LR endorsed Pacoret, the UDI candidate, as part of the UDC alliance.

** Sciabbarrasi stood as a dissident EELV candidate, without the support of the NUPES alliance, of which EELV is a member.

2017

 
 
 
 
 
 
|-
| colspan="8" bgcolor="#E9E9E9"|
|-

2012

 
 
 
 
 
 
|-
| colspan="8" bgcolor="#E9E9E9"|
|-

References

2